Svay Rieng Stadium កីឡដ្ឋាន ខេត្តស្វាយរៀង is a stadium in Svay Rieng Province, Cambodia. It has a capacity of 2,150 spectators. It is the home of Svay Rieng Football Club of the Cambodian League.

Football International Matches

References

Sports venues in Cambodia
Svay Rieng province